Lampanella minima is a species of sea snail, a marine gastropod mollusk in the family Batillariidae.

Description

Distribution

References

External links

Batillariidae
Gastropods described in 1791
Taxa named by Johann Friedrich Gmelin